SISAL (Streams and Iteration in a Single Assignment Language) is a general-purpose single assignment functional programming language with strict semantics, implicit parallelism, and efficient array handling. 
SISAL outputs a dataflow graph in Intermediary Form 1 (IF1). It was derived from VAL (Value-oriented Algorithmic Language, designed by Jack Dennis), and adds recursion and finite streams. It has a Pascal-like syntax and was designed to be a common high-level language for numerical programs on a variety of multiprocessors.

History 
SISAL was defined in 1983 by James McGraw et al., at the University of Manchester, LLNL, Colorado State University and DEC. It was revised in 1985, and the first compiled implementation was made in 1986. Its performance is superior to C and rivals Fortran, according to some sources, combined with efficient and automatic parallelization.

SISAL's name came from grepping "sal" for "Single Assignment Language" from the Unix dictionary /usr/dict/words.

Versions exist for the Cray X-MP, Y-MP, 2; Sequent, Encore Alliant, DEC VAX-11/784, dataflow architectures, KSR1, Transputers and systolic arrays.

Architecture

The requirements for a fine-grain parallelism language are better  met with a dataflow language than a systems language.

SISAL is more than just a dataflow and fine-grain language. It is a set of tools that convert a textual human readable dataflow language into a graph format (named IF1 - Intermediary Form 1). Part of the SISAL project also involved converting this graph format into runable C code.

SISAL Renaissance Era 
In 2010 SISAL saw a brief resurgence when a group of undergraduates at Worcester Polytechnic Institute investigated implementing a fine-grain parallelism backend for the SISAL language.

In 2018 SISAL was modernized with indent-based syntax, first-class functions, lambdas, closures and lazy semantics within a project SISAL-IS.

References

Notes

Bibliography

 VAL Overview
 Sisal Language Tutorial

External links 
 SISAL Parallel Programming SourceForge.net project page

Concurrent programming languages
Functional languages